Caborana is a village and parish (administrative division)  in Aller, a municipality within the province and autonomous community of Asturias, in northern Spain.

Villages

References

Towns in Spain
Parishes in Aller
Populated places in Asturias